Kalyana is a neighborhood in the Pakpattan district of Punjab, Pakistan.Kalyana is a native village of Sir Datar Singh, grandmother of Maneka Gandhi and VM Singh, uncle of Sardar Gurdip Singh. This is very old city .In the old times many communities of Sikh , hindu and Muslims were lived. But Now only Muslim lived there.

There are following famous cities like pakpattan, arifwala, bahwalnagar,Qabola , Sahiwal.
It is 20 km from Pakpattan and at same distance from Arifwala, Punjab, Pakistan.
Kalyana is very

Most people are associated with agriculture.The population of this town is estimated to be near 25,000. Kalyana is 65 KM far from Sahiwal Division of Punjab. People of this city are living very simple life

Families lived in Kalyana

There are following families (casts) lived in Kalyana.
1.Kharal 
2.Kamboh
3.Kumhar
4.Bhatti
5.Watto
6.Sukhera
7.Joia
These people live together and have some basic jobs they do.Noramally Kharal family and Bhatti family are well educated and belong to Govt Jobs. This city have also produced many professionals which doing jobs in Education Sector, Police Department etc.

References

External links 
 pakpattan sharif

Populated places in Pakpattan District